The Campania regional election of 1995 took place on 23 April 1995.

Antonio Rastrelli (National Alliance) was elected President of the Region, defeating Giovanni Vacca (Democratic Party of the Left) and incumbent Giovanni Grasso (Italian People's Party).

For the first time the President of the Region was directly elected by the people, although the election was not yet binding and the President-elect could have been replaced during the term. This is precisely what happened in 1999, when a centre-left majority supported by dissidents of the centre-right, who had formed the Democratic Union for the Republic, ousted Rastrelli and replaced him with centre-right dissident Andrea Losco.

Results

Elections in Campania
1995 elections in Italy